FC Sunkar was a Kazakhstani football club based in Kaskelen.

History
The club was formed in 2004 as Karasai Sarbazdary, before changing its name to Sunkar in 2009. In January 2015, Sunkar folded.

Domestic history

Honours
Kazakhstan First Division (1): 2011

References

External links
The team's squad in 2010

Association football clubs established in 2009
Defunct football clubs in Kazakhstan
2009 establishments in Kazakhstan